Amber is a fossilized tree resin.

Amber may also refer to:

Arts, entertainment, and media

Fiction
 Amber House Trilogy, a projected trilogy of books by Kelly Moore and daughters Tucker Reed and Larkin Reed
 The Chronicles of Amber, a fantasy novel series written by Roger Zelazny

Film and television
 Amber (film), a 1952 Indian film
 Amber (TV series), an Irish TV series
 "Amber 31422," a 2010 episode of the TV series Fringe
 Amber Film & Photography Collective in Newcastle, England

Gaming
 Amber: Journeys Beyond, a 1996 point-and-click computer game
 Amber Diceless Roleplaying Game
 AmberMUSH, a 1992 online computer game

Music

 Amber (band), a British acoustic world music band
 Amber (singer) (Marie-Claire Cremers, born 1969), electronic pop artist from the Netherlands
 Amber (Amber album)
 Amber Bondin (born 1991), also known by her stage name as Amber, a Maltese-British singer
 Amber Liu (singer), a member of the South Korean girl group f(x), known by the mononym AMber
 Amber (Autechre album), 1994
 Amber (Clearlake album), 2006
 Amber, a 1987 album by Michael Jones and David Darling
 "Amber" (song), a song by 311 from their album From Chaos
 "Amber", a song by Afro Celt Sound System on the album Volume 2: Release
 "Amber", a song by Stick to Your Guns on the album The Hope Division

Places

Australia 
Amber, Queensland, a locality in the Shire of Mareeba

Europe 
 Amber Highway, the official name of A1 autostrada (Poland)
 Amber Road, an ancient trade route
 EV9 The Amber Route, a cycling route between the Baltic and Adriatic Seas

India 
 Amber, India (also known as Amer)
 Kingdom of Amber, a historical name for Jaipur State, India

United Kingdom 
 River Amber, Derbyshire, England
 Amber Valley, Derbyshire, England

United States 
 Amber, Iowa
 Amber, Oklahoma
 Amber, Washington
 Amber Township, Michigan

Other places
 Amber Lake (disambiguation)
 Amber Mountain (disambiguation)

Science

Computing
 AMBER, a molecular dynamics force field and software package
 Amber (processor core)
 Amber Smalltalk, a dialect of the Smalltalk programming language
 An Amiga computer chip

Other science
 AMBER (Very Large Telescope)
 AMBER (EURAXESS project)
 Amber mutation, a type of stop codon in genetics
 A unit of volume according to the Winchester measure

Other uses
 Amber (color)
 Amber (name) (including a list of people with the name)
 Amber (cheetah), shown in the series Big Cat Diary
 Amber (restaurant), a restaurant in Hong Kong
 Tropical Storm Amber (disambiguation)
 Amber ale
 AMBER Alert, a child abduction alert bulletin
 Amber language, a language of eastern Indonesia
 USS Amber (PYc-6), a U.S. Navy patrol boat

See also
 Amber Room (disambiguation)
 
 
 Ambar (disambiguation)